Helmold of Bosau (ca. 1120 – after 1177) was a Saxon historian of the 12th century and a priest at Bosau near Plön. He was a friend of the two bishops of Oldenburg in Holstein, Vicelinus (died 1154) and Gerold (died  1163), who did much to Christianize the Polabian Slavs.

History

Helmold was born near Goslar. He grew up in Holstein, and received his instruction in Brunswick from Gerold, the future bishop of Oldenburg (1139–42). Later he came under the direction of Vicelinus, the Apostle of the Wends, first in the Augustinian monastery of Faldera, afterwards known as Neumünster (1147–53). He became a deacon about 1150, and finally became a parish priest in 1156 at Bosau on Großer Plöner See.

At Bishop Gerold's instigation Helmold wrote his Chronica Slavorum, a history of the conquest and conversion of the Polabian Slavs from the time of Charlemagne (about 800) to 1171. The purpose of this chronicle was to demonstrate how Christianity and the German nationality gradually succeeded in gaining a footing among the Wends, especially in the eastern portion of Holstein. As an eyewitness he gives a clear description in fluent Latin of Vicelinus's missionary labors, of the founding of the bishopric in Oldenburg, of the transfer of this bishopric to Lübeck when German commerce at the latter place had become more important than in the former city, of the spread of German influence among the Wends, of the merciless subjugation and extermination of these, and of the summoning to their lands of foreign settlers, principally Westphalian and Dutch. The work is divided into two parts: the first covers a period closing with the year 1168, while the second continues to the year 1171. This second part, however, was written subsequently to 1172.

Helmold was a critical historian, calling Henry the Lion "out for money", and criticizing the Wendish Crusades. He said that among the troops of Henry the Lion during the Wendish Crusade, there was "only talk of money, never about Christianity" and missionary conversion of the Slavs.

Helmold drew his knowledge of the earliest period from the church history of Adam of Bremen and the Saxon records bearing on Henry IV, besides the life of Willehadus, the list of Ansgarius, and perhaps also a life of Vicelinus, but the summaries which he made of these records are unreliable. He is, however, the most important source of information for the history of his own period, his account of which rests on the verbal information of Vicelinus and of Gerold. His fund of information becomes noticeably meager after the latter's death in 1163. His trustworthiness was seriously questioned in the 19th century (see particularly Sehirren, Beiträge zur Kritik holsteinischer Geschichtsquellen, Leipzig, 1876) owing to his antagonism towards the Archbishops of Bremen and his partiality for the Oldenburg-Lübeck bishopric, but it should not be supposed that he was guilty of an intentional falsification of facts. The chronicle was first published in 1556 at Frankfurt, and later in Monumenta Germaniae Historica: Scriptores, XXI (1868), 11-99, and in "Script. rer. Germ."

Henry the Lion, Duke of Saxony, was Helmold's patron. The chronicle was continued down to 1209 by Abbot Arnold of Lübeck.

Notes

References
The Chronica were first edited by Siegmund Schorkel (Frankfort am Main, 1556). The best edition is by J.M. Lappenberg in Monumenta Germaniae hist. scriptores, XXI (1868).
For critical works on the Chronica see August Potthast, Bibliotheca hist. medaevius. Helmoldus.
Wattenbach, Deutschlands Geschichtsquellen, II (1894), 338-41.
Potthast, Bibliotheca historica, I (1896), 576.
This article incorporates text from the 1913 Catholic Encyclopedia article "Helmold" by Patricius Schlager, a publication now in the public domain.
"Helmold Of Bosau". Encyclopædia Britannica 2006 Ultimate Reference Suite DVD. Accessed May 14, 2007.
Helmold von Bosau

Attribution

12th-century births
12th-century deaths
12th-century German historians
German chroniclers
People from the Duchy of Holstein
12th-century German Roman Catholic priests
Christians of the Wendish Crusade
German male non-fiction writers
12th-century Latin writers
People from Ostholstein